Miane is a comune (municipality) in the Province of Treviso in the Italian region Veneto, located about  northwest of Venice and about  northwest of Treviso.

The municipality of Miane contains the frazioni (subdivisions, mainly villages and hamlets) Combai, Campea, and Premaor.

Miane borders the following municipalities: Farra di Soligo, Follina, Mel, Valdobbiadene.

Demographic evolution

References

External links
 www.comunedimiane.it/

Cities and towns in Veneto